Ballycor may refer to:
Ballycor, County Antrim, a townland and civil parish in County Antrim, Northern Ireland
Ballycor, County Westmeath, a townland in County Westmeath, Ireland